The Munster Schools Senior Cup or  Munster Senior Cup is the under-age rugby union competition for schools affiliated to the Munster Branch of the IRFU. The trophy is named after Garrett Fitzgerald former CBC coach, Munster coach and Munster CEO.

The inaugural Munster Schools Senior Cup took place in 1909 and, since then, Cork city's two all-boys schools have been to the fore as the only rugby playing schools in the city. Christian Brothers College have 31 titles, whilst Presentation Brothers College have 31. Rockwell College (26) were once the team to beat in the competition, holding the record for most wins until the 1980s. However, Rockwell have only won the cup five times since. 

Limerick CBS (4) won Limerick's first trophies in the 1920s and 1930s, followed by Crescent College Comprehensive (12) which contributed three in the 1940s and 1950s, whilst St. Munchin's (5) won their first in 1968. Mungret College, merged into CCC in 1974, also took the trophy once in 1941. In addition Ardscoil Rís, and St. Enda's have all competed in finals. The most recent winners are PBC, who overcame a strong CBC team 24-0.  

The competition's final generally takes place every year around St. Patrick's day, and alternates between being played in Thomond Park or Musgrave Park, unless there are two teams from one city playing; in that case, the game shall take place in that city.

Standing
Schools rugby is seen by the IRFU as one of the two channels for players to learn their rugby and advance to senior levels.

Many players that have taken part in (and won) the Senior cup have gone on to represent Munster and Ireland. Former winners of the Cup include:, Ronan O'Gara (PBC), Peter Stringer (PBC), Simon Zebo (PBC), Peter O'Mahony (PBC), David Wallace (CCC), Donnacha Ryan (St. Munchin's), Conor Murray (St. Munchin's), Keith Earls (St. Munchin's), Jerry Flannery (St. Munchin's) and Paul O'Connell (Ardscoil Rís) also played Senior Cup rugby for their respective schools.

Winners

Honours

1900s

1909 Christian Brothers College beat Rockwell College

1910s

1910 Rockwell College
1911 Rockwell College
1912 Rockwell College
1913 Christian Brothers College
1914 Rockwell College
1915 Rockwell College
1916 Christian Brothers College
1917 Rockwell College
1918 Presentation Brothers College
1919 Christian Brothers College

1920s

1920 Presentation Brothers College
1921 The Abbey, Tipperary
1922 Christian Brothers College
1923 Competition cancelled as only one school entered
1924 Christian Brothers College
1925 Christian Brothers College
1926 Limerick CBS
1927 Presentation Brothers College
1928 Rockwell College
1929 Rockwell College

1930s

1930 Rockwell College beat Presentation Brothers College
1931 Limerick CBS
1932 Presentation Brothers College
1933 Limerick CBS
1934 Limerick CBS ??
1935 Presentation Brothers College, Cork??
1936 Christian Brothers College
1937 Rockwell College beat Presentation Brothers College
1938 Presentation Brothers College, Cobh beat Presentation Brothers College
1939 Presentation Brothers College

1940s

1940 Rockwell College beat Presentation Brothers College
1941 Mungret College
1942 Rockwell College
1943 Christian Brothers College
1944 Christian Brothers College beat Rockwell College
1945 Presentation Brothers College
1946 Presentation Brothers College
1947 Crescent College beat Presentation Brothers College
1948 Presentation Brothers College
1949 Crescent College beat Rockwell College

1950s

1950 Rockwell College beat Mungret College
1951 Crescent College beat St. Munchin's
1952 Presentation Brothers College
1953 Presentation Brothers College
1954 Christian Brothers College, Cork beat Rockwell College
1955 Rockwell College
1956 Christian Brothers College
1957 Presentation Brothers College beat Crescent College
1958 Presentation Brothers College
1959 Rockwell College

1960s

1960 Rockwell College beat Presentation Brothers College
1961 Rockwell College beat Christian Brothers College
1962 Christian Brothers College beat Rockwell College
1963 Crescent College
1964 Rockwell College beat Christian Brothers College
1965 Presentation Brothers College beat Crescent College
1966 Presentation Brothers College beat Rockwell College
1967 Rockwell College
1968 St. Munchin's beat Rockwell College
1969 Presentation Brothers College

1970s

1970 Rockwell College beat Glenstal
1971 Christian Brothers College beat St. Munchin's
1972 Christian Brothers College beat St. Munchin's
1973 Christian Brothers College beat Rockwell College
1974 Christian Brothers College beat Presentation Brothers College
1975 Presentation Brothers College beat Rockwell College
1976 Christian Brothers College beat Presentation Brothers College
1977 Christian Brothers College beat Presentation Brothers College
1978 Presentation Brothers College beat Christian Brothers College
1979 Christian Brothers College beat Presentation Brothers College

1980s

1980 Christian Brothers College beat Presentation Brothers College
1981 Presentation Brothers College beat Christian Brothers College
1982 St. Munchin's beat Presentation Brothers College
1983 Crescent College beat Presentation Brothers College, Cork
1984 Christian Brothers College beat Crescent College
1985 Rockwell College beat Christian Brothers College
1986 Crescent College beat Christian Brothers College
1987 Presentation Brothers College beat St. Enda's
1988 Christian Brothers College beat St. Enda's
1989 Crescent College  beat Christian Brothers College 12-9

1990s

1990 Crescent College beat Rockwell College
1991 Presentation Brothers College beat Rockwell College 4 - 0
1992 Presentation Brothers College beat St. Munchin's 14 - 3
1993 Presentation Brothers College beat St. Munchin's
1994 Crescent College beat Presentation Brothers College
1995 Presentation Brothers College beat Crescent College 14 - 7
1996 Presentation Brothers College beat Ardscoil Rís
1997 Christian Brothers College beat St. Munchin's
1998 Christian Brothers College beat Presentation Brothers College
1999 Christian Brothers College beat St. Munchin's

2000s

2000 Christian Brothers College beat Rockwell College 25–18
2001 Rockwell College beat St. Munchin's 17 - 5
2002 St. Munchin's beat Presentation Brothers College 20–19
2003 Christian Brothers College beat Presentation Brothers College 11–8
2004 St. Munchin's beat Presentation Brothers College 11–10
2005 Presentation Brothers College beat Christian Brothers College 6–3
2006 St. Munchin's beat Presentation Brothers College 7–3
2007 Presentation Brothers College beat Christian Brothers College 13–3
2008 Castletroy College beat Christian Brothers College 21–15
2009 Christian Brothers College beat Rockwell College 33–19

2010s

 2010 Presentation Brothers College beat Rockwell College 22–10
 2011 Rockwell College beat Presentation Brothers College 9–3
 2012 Rockwell College beat St. Munchin's 6–5
 2013 Crescent College Comprehensive beat Rockwell College 27–5
 2014 Crescent College Comprehensive beat Ardscoil Rís 21–7
 2015 Rockwell College beat Ardscoil Rís 23–13
 2016 Christian Brothers College beat  Crescent College Comprehensive 9–8
 2017 Presentation Brothers College beat Glenstal Abbey 11–3
 2018 Glenstal Abbey beat Christian Brothers College 18–17
 2019 Christian Brothers College beat Presentation Brothers College 5–3

2020s

2020 Presentation Brothers College and Christian Brothers College (Final scratched and title shared due to COVID-19 pandemic)
2021 Competition cancelled due to COVID-19 pandemic
2022 Crescent College Comprehensive beat Presentation Brothers College 26–5
2023 Presentation Brothers College beat Christians Brothers College 24-0

See also
 Munster Rugby
 Munster Schools Junior Cup
 Connacht Schools Senior Cup
 Leinster Schools Senior Cup
 Ulster Schools Senior Cup
 Ireland national schoolboy rugby union team

References

External links
Munster Rugby official site

High school rugby union competitions in Ireland
Rugby union competitions in Munster
1909 establishments in Ireland